Kristel Arianne Köbrich Schimpl (born August 9, 1985 in Santiago, Chile) is an Olympic long-distance freestyle swimmer from Chile. She was the country's flag bearer at the 2004 Olympics, and also swam at the 2008 Games, 2012 Games and 2016 Games.

She is the current holder of the South American records in the women's 800 m and 1500 m freestyle (long and short course). She also has the Chilean Records in the 200, 400, 800 and 1500 freestyles (2:04.81, 4:11.83, 8:21.66, and 15:57.57), and the 400 IM (4:58.68).

She represented Chile at the 2020 Summer Olympics.

References

1985 births
Living people
Chilean female long-distance swimmers
Chilean female medley swimmers
Chilean female freestyle swimmers
Swimmers at the 2003 Pan American Games
Swimmers at the 2004 Summer Olympics
Swimmers at the 2008 Summer Olympics
Swimmers at the 2011 Pan American Games
Swimmers at the 2012 Summer Olympics
Swimmers at the 2015 Pan American Games
Swimmers at the 2016 Summer Olympics
Olympic swimmers of Chile
Sportspeople from Santiago
Chilean people of Swiss-German descent
Pan American Games gold medalists for Chile
Pan American Games silver medalists for Chile
Pan American Games bronze medalists for Chile
Pan American Games medalists in swimming
South American Games gold medalists for Chile
South American Games silver medalists for Chile
South American Games bronze medalists for Chile
South American Games medalists in swimming
Competitors at the 2002 South American Games
Competitors at the 2006 South American Games
Competitors at the 2010 South American Games
Competitors at the 2014 South American Games
Medalists at the 2003 Pan American Games
Medalists at the 2011 Pan American Games
Medalists at the 2015 Pan American Games
Swimmers at the 2020 Summer Olympics
21st-century Chilean women